Nathalia Norah Ramos Cohen (born July 3, 1992) is an American actress. She is known for her portrayals of Yasmin in the 2007 film Bratz, Jill in the 2013 film The Damned, and lead character Nina Martin in the first two seasons of the 2011 Nickelodeon television series House of Anubis.

Early and personal life
Ramos was born in Madrid, Spain. Her mother is from Australia and her father is Juan Carlos Ramos Vaquero, known by his stage name, "Iván", a Spanish pop singer. She moved to Melbourne, Australia at age two, then relocated to Miami when she was four, and grew up there. Ramos attended North Beach Elementary, Nautilus Middle School in Miami Beach and briefly attended Miami Beach Senior High during her freshman year. She then moved to Los Angeles and graduated from Beverly Hills High School and attended and graduated from the University of Southern California with a degree in political science with a concentration in South East Asian politics in 2018. She is Jewish, as is her mother.

Ramos became an American citizen on June 2, 2016.

On December 28, 2021, Ramos married Derek An after 13 years of dating and announced on January 14, 2022 her pregnancy with her first child.

Career 

In 2007, Ramos appeared in the theatrical Bratz motion picture, playing the leading role of Yasmin. She made a brief appearance in the music video for Prima J's single "Rockstar" which was a tie-in with the Bratz film and was featured on the film's official soundtrack and provided her voice for the Bratz 4 Real video game. She was featured in an episode of the Nickelodeon series True Jackson, VP, portraying an unpredictable teenage supermodel. She had a role in 31 North 62 East, a psychological thriller film directed by British director Tristan Loraine.

Ramos starred in the Nickelodeon television series House of Anubis for two seasons as the lead character, Nina Martin, who travels to England in order to attend a mysterious boarding school. She stated that she would not return to House of Anubis for a third season due to her concentrating on college.

In 2012, Ramos was cast in the 2013 horror film The Damned (originally titled Gallow's Hill), playing Jill, the daughter of Peter Facinelli's character. In 2016, Ramos headlined the faith-based psychological thriller film Wildflower, playing Chloe, an artistic college student who is traumatized by her past.

Filmography

Film

Television

Music video and video game 
 Video game: Bratz 4 Real (2007), as Yasmin
 Music video promo for Bratz: The Movie: "Rockstar" (2009) by Prima J

References

External links

1992 births
American child actresses
American film actresses
American television actresses
Spanish Jews
Hispanic and Latino American actresses
Jewish American actresses
Living people
Actresses from Madrid
Spanish people of Australian descent
Spanish expatriates in the United States
21st-century Spanish actresses
American voice actresses
People with acquired American citizenship
American Sephardic Jews
21st-century American women